Yenisey is a Russian Navy hospital ship of the Ob-class hospital ship. Yenisey is part of the Black Sea Fleet.

Development 
The four Ob-class hospital ships were designed to provide medical and recreational facilities. They were also employed as personnel transports. They have civilian crews but carry uniformed naval medical personnel. The ships are fully equipped with surgical equipment. Later two units are Project B-320 II, implying a modification to the basic design; the external differences are minor.

Construction and career
She was laid down on 10 September 1979 and launched on 4 April 1980 by Adolf Barsky shipyard. Commissioned on 30 January 1981 as a hospital ship.

Gallery

References 

Ships built in Russia
1980 ships
Hospital ships of the Soviet Union and Russia
Hospital ships
Auxiliary ships of the Russian Navy
Ob-class hospital ships